Matthew Gray Gubler (born March 9, 1980) is an American actor, filmmaker, fashion model, painter, illustrator, director, and author. He is best known for his role as criminal profiler Dr. Spencer Reid in the CBS television show Criminal Minds, for which he directed several episodes. Gubler has appeared in The Life Aquatic with Steve Zissou, 500 Days of Summer, Life After Beth, Suburban Gothic, and Newness. He was also the voice of Simon in Alvin and the Chipmunks and its three sequels.

Early life and education
Gubler was born on March 9, 1980, in Las Vegas, Nevada, the son of Marilyn ( Kelch), a rancher and political consultant, and John Gubler, an attorney. Gubler is a high school graduate of the Las Vegas Academy of the Arts, where he studied acting because the school did not offer his first choice, filmmaking. He is a graduate of the New York University Tisch School of the Arts, where he majored in film directing.

Career

Modeling
While studying film at NYU, Gubler was discovered by a model scout and then worked as a model with DNA Model Management for Tommy Hilfiger, Marc Jacobs, and American Eagle, among others. He has been ranked 46th on models.com's list of top 50 male models.

Acting

After he began modeling, Gubler had an internship with Wes Anderson, who encouraged him to audition for a part in his movie The Life Aquatic with Steve Zissou. Gubler did, and landed the role of Nico (a.k.a. Intern #1). This led, in 2005, to Gubler's leading role as Dr. Spencer Reid in Criminal Minds but will not be returning, with the majority of the final season's cast, for the revival.

Gubler had a small role in the film RV (2006) as the disreputable Joe Joe. He voiced Simon the chipmunk in Alvin and the Chipmunks (2007), Alvin and the Chipmunks: The Squeakquel (2009), Alvin and the Chipmunks: Chipwrecked (2011), and Alvin and the Chipmunks: The Road Chip (2015) alongside Jason Lee (Dave), Justin Long (Alvin), and Jesse McCartney (Theodore). He appeared as Bart, the main character, in How to Be a Serial Killer (2008), and as Paul in (500) Days of Summer (2009). He provided the voice of Winsor in Scooby-Doo! Legend of the Phantosaur (2011).

In 2014, Gubler acted in the zombie comedy Life After Beth and the film Suburban Gothic, for which he received the Screamfest Award for Best Actor.

Gubler has done voice work for the DC Universe Animated Original Movies line. He played Jimmy Olsen in All-Star Superman and voices the Riddler in the animated film, Batman: Assault on Arkham (2014). Gubler has also appeared in the films Band of Robbers (2015), 68 Kill (2017), Endings, Beginnings (2019), and Horse Girl (2020). He appeared in the 2019 Hulu series Dollface.

Filmmaking
While making The Life Aquatic with Steve Zissou, Gubler made a documentary titled Matthew Gray Gubler's Life Aquatic Intern Journal, a behind-the-scenes view of the making of the film, which was later included in The Criterion Collection DVD release. He directed and starred in a series of self-deprecating mockumentaries titled Matthew Gray Gubler: the Unauthorized Documentary in which he parodies Hollywood behavior, which were filmed on the set of Criminal Minds. A follow-up, Matthew Gray Gubler: The Authorized Documentary, was also made, although only one episode is currently available.

Gubler directed, edited, and co-produced the music video for "Don't Shoot Me Santa" by the rock band The Killers.

Gubler directed the Criminal Minds Season 5 episode "Mosley Lane" (5x16), which originally aired March 3, 2010, along with the episode "Lauren" (6x18), which aired a year later, on March 16, 2011. The episode "Lauren" included the exit of Criminal Minds series regular Paget Brewster, who maintains a friendship with Gubler outside of work on the show. Brewster specifically asked Gubler to direct her last episode, although it was announced later that she would return for Season 7. Gubler later directed the Criminal Minds episodes "Heathridge Manor" (7x19), which aired April 4, 2012, "The Lesson" (8x10), which aired December 5, 2012, "Alchemy" (8x20), "Gatekeeper"(9x07), "Blood Relations" (9x20), "Mr. Scratch" (10x21), "A Beautiful Disaster" (11x18), which included the departure of series regular Shemar Moore, "Elliott's Pond" (12x06), "The Capilanos" (13x17), and "The Tall Man" (14x05).

Painting
Since 2005, Gubler has been posting paintings on his website. His media include watercolor, gouache, oil, and pastel. In September 2005, the Gallery of Fine Art in Ostrava, Czech Republic, held a showing of 12 watercolors by Gubler; all the works were sold. On September 6, 2008, his art was featured in a group show entitled "Paper Cuts" at The Little Bird art gallery in Atwater Village, California. Gubler contributed a painting of "Sandy The Mammoth" to the Western Heritage Museum & Lea County Cowboy Hall of Fame. In July 2010, his paintings were featured in Juxtapoz magazine.

In October 2011, an original watercolor by Gubler entitled "Mushface" was sold on eBay for $10,100. Gubler donated the proceeds to the Smith Center for the Performing Arts in Las Vegas.

Gubler's paintings were highlighted in a 2013 interview with BuzzFeed.

Publications
Gubler wrote and illustrated his first book, Rumple Buttercup: A Story of Bananas, Belonging and Being Yourself, which was released on April 2, 2019. It is published as a children's book, but Gubler says it is for all ages, "for anyone who's ever felt like they didn't quite fit in, just to make them know that they're not alone... My hope in writing the book was to find a way to give the world a 136-page hug." He hand-wrote or hand-drew everything in the book – "every single word, every single illustration, including the bar code and the lengthy copyright page." Within weeks of its release, the book was ranked #1 in its category on the New York Times Best Seller list.

The story concerns a sensitive monster named Rumple Buttercup, who is so self-conscious about his appearance – green skin, five crooked teeth, and three strands of hair – that he fears he will be rejected by people, so he spends his life hiding in a sewer. He emerges only at night, wearing a banana peel on his head as a disguise. Eventually he discovers that people actually do accept him despite his differences. In promotional appearances, Gubler sometimes wears a 7-foot-tall Rumple costume or a banana peel on his head. He initially planned to self-publish the work, but decided that Random House would be a good fit for him at his first meeting: "The Random House publishers came to the meeting with banana peels on their heads, and I was immediately enchanted."

Personal life
Gubler divides his time among Los Angeles, Las Vegas, and New York City.

In 2009, while filming (500) Days of Summer in Los Angeles, Gubler dislocated his knee while out dancing. The injury required three surgical procedures and the use of a cane for nearly a year, which was written into the script of Criminal Minds. 

On October 27, 2014, Gubler became a certified minister and officiated at the wedding of his Criminal Minds co-star Paget Brewster and Steve Damstra, on November 29, 2014.

Filmography

Film

Television

Miscellaneous

References

External links

 

1980 births
Male actors from Nevada
American male film actors
Male models from Nevada
Daytime Emmy Award winners
American male television actors
American television personalities
Male television personalities
American male voice actors
Living people
Tisch School of the Arts alumni
Male actors from Las Vegas
21st-century American male actors
American children's writers
American children's book illustrators